Burlington has had a city council-mayor form of government since 1865 with its first mayor being Albert L. Catlin. Democrats and Progressives make up the majority of the council. Miro Weinberger, the current mayor, is a Democrat who was first elected in 2012. The City Council has twelve seats.

The large transient student population votes in local, state, and national elections, resulting in a considerable impact on local elections. The city signed up 2,527 new voters in the six weeks from September 1, 2008, the highest number for that time frame in over nine years.
In 2021, voters adopted a charter amendment to elect the council by ranked-choice voting. Before the amendment could go into effect, however, it had to be passed by the state legislature and approved by the governor. The state house approved the amendment on February 23, 2022, sending it to the state senate. The senate passed the bill on April 5, and the governor approved it on April 20.

Despite the fact that Progressives held a majority on the council, Democrat Karen Paul was elected council president in 2022. The role of council president is largely ceremonial, and outgoing council president Max Tracy remarked that the position brings little actual power. Zoraya Hightower, the de facto leader of the Progressive caucus, said she passed up the council president position in order to focus on her committee work. Independent councillor Ali Dieng also expressed interest in the council president position but did not formally seek it, admitting he did not have the necessary support.

City council members

*Council president

Elections
Prior to 2020, the council's twelve seats were occupied by five Progressives, four Democrats, two Independents, and one Republican. After the 2020 city elections, the Republican seat flipped to Democratic, and one Independent seat flipped to Progressive.

In late 2022, two Progressive councillors resigned from office: East Ward incumbent Jack Hanson resigned on September 13 to apply for a job at the Burlington Electric Department and Ward 8 incumbent Ali House resigned on October 5 for unspecified reasons. Mayor Miro Weinberger scheduled a special election for Hanson's seat on December 6, 2022, but the special election for House's seat could not be held until the regularly-scheduled council elections in March 2023 because she resigned after October 1. Democrat Maea Brandt won the special election for Hanson's seat, giving Democrats the most seats on the council for the first time since 2020. This was the first election in Burlington to use ranked-choice voting after its revival, although Brandt won an outright majority of 55% in the first round and no ranked-choice tabulation was necessary.

Notes

References

Government of Burlington, Vermont
City councils in the United States